Natalya Yuryevna "Natasha" Chmyreva (28 May 1958 – 16 August 2015) was a Russian tennis player who won 1975 and 1976  Wimbledon girls' singles championships and 1975  US Open girls' singles championship

Life
Natasha Chmyreva was born on 28 May 1958 in the USSR.

Career
In 1975, Natasha Chmyreva reached the semifinals of the Australian Open, losing to Martina Navratilova. In 1976, she reached the quarterfinals of the U.S. Open. Her last international match was against Tracy Austin at the Fed Cup in 1979.

References

External links
 
 
 
 </ref>

1958 births
2015 deaths
Wimbledon junior champions
US Open (tennis) junior champions
Soviet female tennis players
Grand Slam (tennis) champions in girls' singles
Universiade medalists in tennis
Universiade gold medalists for the Soviet Union
Universiade silver medalists for the Soviet Union